Sentimental Journey may refer to:

Film and television
 Sentimental Journey (film), a 1946 motion picture starring Maureen O'Hara
 "A Sentimental Journey" (Randall and Hopkirk), a 1970 episode of the TV series Randall and Hopkirk (Deceased)
 Sentimental Journey (anime), a 1998 anime based on the Sentimental Graffiti video game

Literature
 A Sentimental Journey Through France and Italy, a novel by Laurence Sterne
 Sentimental Journey (book), a photo-book by Nobuyoshi Araki
 A Sentimental Journey: Memoirs, 1917–1922, an autobiographical work by Viktor Shklovsky

Music
 "Sentimental Journey" (song), 1945 song by the Les Brown orchestra sung by Doris Day
 Doris Day's Sentimental Journey, a 1965 album by Doris Day
 Sentimental Journey (Rosemary Clooney album), 2001
 Sentimental Journey (Lou Donaldson album), 1995
 Sentimental Journey (Houston Person album), 2002
 Sentimental Journey (Emmy Rossum album), 2013
 Sentimental Journey (Ringo Starr album), 1970
 Sentimental Journey: Pop Vocal Classics, a four-volume compact disc collection of late 1940s to early 1950s popular hits, issued in 1993
 "Sentimental Journey", a song by Iyo Matsumoto, 1981
 "Sentimental Journey", a song by Pere Ubu from their 1978 album The Modern Dance

Other
 Sentimental Journey (aircraft), a B-17 Flying Fortress bomber aircraft